Frances Donald is a Canadian-born economist and the Chief Economist of Manulife Financial,  Educated at Queen's University and New York University she is a sought-after commentator on global economic conditions. In 2019 she was recognized as one of Canada's Most Powerful Women Top 100.

Early life and education 
Donald was born in Montreal and attended school at the CEGEP John Abbot College. She obtained her Bachelor of Economics from Queen's University in 2008. Donald worked as a research analyst for the Bank of Canada before attending New York University where she earned her Masters in economics in 2010.  

Prior to joining Manulife, Donald worked as a financial economist for Scotiabank in Toronto, and before that as a global macro analyst for Pavilion Global Markets in Montreal. Her early experience included various positions at Deloitte and Roubini Global Economics.

Manulife 
She joined Manulife in 2016 as a senior economist working to become Head of Macro-Economic Strategy in 2018.  In 2019, at age 33 she became the youngest Chief Economist in Canada and one of only two women to hold the title in Canada.

References 

Year of birth missing (living people)
Living people

Queen's University at Kingston alumni